Shanqella (Amharic: ሻንቅላ šanqəlla sometimes spelled Shankella, Shangella, Shánkala, Shankalla or Shangalla) is an exonym for a number of ethnic groups that today reside primarily in the westernmost part of Ethiopia near South Sudan (especially Benishangul-Gumuz Region), but are known to have also inhabited more northerly areas until the late nineteenth century. A pejorative, the term was traditionally used by the local Afro-Asiatic-speaking populations to refer in general terms to darker-skinned ethnic groups, particularly to those from communities speaking Nilo-Saharan languages of Western Ethiopia. These were regarded as slave reserves by the highlanders. The etymology of Shanqella is uncertain. It has been suggested that the appellation may stem from an Amharic epithet meaning "black" (or dark-skinned). However, it is likely that the term is instead of more ancient, Agaw derivation given the Agaw substratum in the Amharic language. The 1935 League of Nations report detailed the dehumanization of Shanqella under the Ethiopian Empire.

See also
Jareer, analogous Somali term

Notes

References

Further reading
 

Pankhurst, R. 1977. The history of the Bareya, Shanqella, and other Ethiopian slaves from the borderlands of the Sudan. Sudan Notes and Records 59: 1-43.

Anti-African and anti-black slurs
Anti-black racism in Africa
Ethnic groups in Ethiopia
Exonyms